The IMOCA 60 Class yacht Whirlpool-Europe 2 was designed by Marc Lombard and launched in the August 1998 after being built Mag in France.

Racing results

References 

Individual sailing vessels
1990s sailing yachts
Sailing yachts designed by Marc Lombard
Sailboat types built in France
Vendée Globe boats
IMOCA 60